Juan Fernández Santiago (born 11 September 1999) is a Spanish footballer who plays for Real Murcia. Mainly a forward, he can also play as a winger.

Club career
Born in Barcelona, Catalonia, Fernández represented AE Unificació Badalona Sud, FC Barcelona (two stints), RCD Espanyol and UE Cornellà; he finished his formation with Barça in 2018. On 24 August of that year he returned to Cornellà, being assigned to the first team in the Segunda División B.

Fernández made his senior debut 26 August 2018, starting in a 1–1 away draw against UE Olot. The following 30 January, he signed for UD Las Palmas and was assigned to the reserves also in the third division.

Fernández made his first team debut for the Canarians on 31 August 2019, coming on as a second-half substitute for Cristian Cedrés in a 2–2 home draw against Racing de Santander in the Segunda División. On 18 August 2021, he moved to Segunda División RFEF side Real Murcia.

Honours

Club
Barcelona
UEFA Youth League: 2017–18

References

External links

1999 births
Living people
Footballers from Barcelona
Spanish footballers
Association football forwards
Segunda División players
Segunda División B players
UE Cornellà players
UD Las Palmas Atlético players
UD Las Palmas players
Real Murcia players